This is a recap of the 1993 season for the Professional Bowlers Association (PBA) Tour. It was the tour's 35th season, and consisted of 35 events.

PBA Player of the Year Walter Ray Williams, Jr. dominated the season with seven victories and a 299 game in the first match in the Leisure's Long Island open against Robert Lawrence, while leading nearly every statistical category. He had a good chance to tie Mark Roth's 1978 single-season record of eight titles, having collected an additional four runner-up finishes during the year.

Ron Polombi, Jr. captured his second career major title at the Bud Light PBA National Championship. Del Ballard, Jr. became the PBA's third two-time winner of the modern-day BPAA U.S. Open, joining Marshall Holman and Pete Weber.

George Branham III made history in what would be the final Firestone Tournament of Champions, becoming the first African American to win a PBA major. Prior to the tournament, the PBA announced that General Tire would be taking over sponsorship of the ToC, which had been sponsored by Firestone Tire since 1965.

Mike Aulby rolled the PBA's sixth televised 300 game at the Wichita Open, defeating David Ozio 300–279 in the highest-scoring TV match in PBA history.

Tournament schedule

References

External links
1993 Season Schedule

Professional Bowlers Association seasons
1993 in bowling